Danylo Konovalov (born 18 April 2003 in Mykolayiv, Ukraine) is a Ukrainian diver. He is a silver medallist of the 2022 European Championships.

Career 
Konovalov's international debut took place at the 2021 World Junior Championships in Kyiv. He shared gold with Brazil's Kawan Pereira at the 3m springboard in age group A and won a silver medal together with his teammate Bohdan Chyzhovskyi in the 3m springboard synchro competitions.

At the World Championships in Budapest, he competed in the 3 metre springboard competition but finished just 50th in the preliminary round.

Konovalov won his first senior medal at the 2022 European Championships in Rome where he finished 2nd in the team event (together with Baylo, Kesar, and Boliukh).

References

External links 
 Konovalov's profile at the website of FINA

Ukrainian male divers
Living people
2003 births
Sportspeople from Mykolaiv
21st-century Ukrainian people